Glen Goodall (born 22 January 1970) is a Canadian former professional ice hockey player who last played for ERC Ingolstadt in the Deutsche Eishockey Liga (DEL). He was selected by the Detroit Red Wings in the 10th round (206th overall) of the 1988 NHL Entry Draft.

Seattle Thunderbirds
A member of the Seattle Thunderbirds from  1984–90, Goodall is the all-time leader of the Western Hockey League in games played (399) and goals scored (262), and second in points scored (573). Goodall was the first player in WHL history to score 3 short-handed goals in a game, accomplishing the feat on January 27, 1990 versus the Victoria Cougars. His record-setting 63 goals scored during his 16-year-old season in 1986-87 still stands as the highest goals total in a season by a 16-year-old in the WHL.

Awards
 WHL West Second All-Star Team – 1987 & 1990
Four Broncos Memorial Trophy (WHL Player of the Year) (1989–90)

Career statistics

References

External links

1970 births
Living people
Adirondack Red Wings players
Binghamton Rangers players
Canadian ice hockey centres
Deggendorfer SC players
Detroit Red Wings draft picks
Erie Panthers players
Flint Spirits players
EHC Klostersee players
Ice hockey people from British Columbia
ERC Ingolstadt players
San Diego Gulls (IHL) players
Schwenninger Wild Wings players
Seattle Breakers players
Seattle Thunderbirds players
Starbulls Rosenheim players